Cass Timberlane is a 1947 romantic drama film starring Spencer Tracy, Lana Turner and Zachary Scott and directed by George Sidney. It was based on the 1945 novel Cass Timberlane: A Novel of Husbands and Wives by Sinclair Lewis, which was Lewis' nineteenth novel and one of his last.

Plot
Judge Cass Timberlane is a middle-aged, incorruptible, highly respected man who enjoys good books and playing the flute. He falls for Ginny, a much younger girl from the lower class in his small Minnesota town. At first, the marriage is happy, but Ginny becomes bored with the small town and with the judge's friends. She leaves him for an affair with a lawyer, Timberlane's boyhood friend. Eventually, disillusioned with her lover, Ginny returns to her husband and becomes his loyal wife. The novel is Lewis's examination of marriage, love, romance, heartache and trust.

Cast

Production

Cultural references
Wolcott Gibbs spoofed the novel in The New Yorker as "Shad Ampersand".
The song "Cleo the Cat" by the band Benton Harbor Lunchbox was inspired by the novel Cass Timberlane: A Novel of Husbands and Wives.

Reception
Though it received tepid critical reviews, the film was a box office hit, earning $3,983,000 in the U.S. and Canada and $1,203,000 elsewhere, but because of its high production cost, it returned a profit of only $746,000.

Home media
Cass Timberlane was released to DVD by Warner Home Video on July 6, 2010, via Warner Archives as a DVD-on-demand disc available through Amazon.

In other media

Radio
Cass Timberlane was presented on Theatre Guild on the Air February 15, 1953. The one-hour adaptation starred Fredric March and Nina Foch.

References

Further reading

External links 
 
 
 
 
 

1945 American novels
American novels adapted into films
Novels by Sinclair Lewis
Novels set in Minnesota
Novels set in New York City
1947 films
1947 romantic drama films
American romantic drama films
American black-and-white films
Films scored by Roy Webb
Films based on American novels
Films based on works by Sinclair Lewis
Films directed by George Sidney
Films set in Minnesota
Films set in New York City
Metro-Goldwyn-Mayer films
Films with screenplays by Donald Ogden Stewart
1947 drama films
1940s American films